The Ensuring Patient Access and Effective Drug Enforcement Act of 2016 is a United States federal statute enacted by the 114th United States Congress and signed into law by President Barack Obama on April 19, 2016. It modified the Controlled Substances Act, which requires the Drug Enforcement Administration (DEA) to identify "imminent danger to the public health and safety" before suspending the registration of a manufacturer, distributor, or dispenser for controlled substances privileges.

It "hampered the DEA's ability to seize suspicious shipments [of opioids]" within the context of the opioid epidemic.

It was cosponsored by Sen. Sheldon Whitehouse [D-RI], Sen. Marco Rubio [R-FL], Sen. David Vitter [R-LA], Rep. Marsha Blackburn and Sen. Bill Cassidy [R-LA].

An earlier iteration of the bill was introduced by Rep. Tom Marino [R-PA] and passed the House of Representatives in 2015. This was purportedly the reason behind Marino's withdrawal of his candidacy for Director of the Office of National Drug Control Policy (aka drug czar).

It has been reported on by various news agencies including the Washington Post, Fox News, USA Today, and the story was originally broken by CBS/60 Minutes.

References 

Acts of the 114th United States Congress
United States federal controlled substances legislation
Drug Enforcement Administration
United States domestic policy
Public policy of the Obama administration
Controlled Substances Act